Queimada is an alcoholic beverage of Galician tradition.
 
 

Queimada is a punch made from Galician aguardente (orujo from Galicia) -a spirit distilled from the rests of winemaking- and flavoured with special herbs or coffee, plus sugar, lemon peel, coffee beans and cinnamon. It is traditionally prepared in a hollow pumpkin.

Typically, while preparing the punch a spell or incantation is recited, so that special powers are conferred to the queimada and those drinking it. Then the queimada is set alight, and slowly burns as more brandy is added.

Origins 
Queimada has origins in the celtic pagan festivals of Galicia. Probably is an inheritance of the ancient celtic druids that has been transmitted along generations. It is a punch made from Galician aguardente (Orujo Gallego) - a spirit distilled from wine and flavoured with special herbs or coffee, plus sugar, lemon peel, coffee beans and cinnamon.

Traditionally while preparing the punch a spell or incantation is recited, so that special powers are conferred to the queimada and those drinking it. Then the queimada is set alight, and slowly burns as more brandy is added.

Tradition 
The goal of the preparation ritual is to distance the bad spirits that, according with the tradition, lie in wait for men and women to try to curse them. All occasions are good for a queimada: a party, familiar meetings or gatherings of friends. After dinner, in the darkness of night, is one of the best times for it. The tradition also says that one of the perfect days to make the conxuro da queimada ('spell of queimada') is in Samhain, the Celtic New Year's Eve. However, typically the queimada ritual takes place during St. John's Night or 'witches' night' on the 23rd of June.

The people who take part in it gather around the container where it is prepared, ideally without lights, to cheer up the hearts and to be better friends. One of them ends the process of making the queimada while reciting the spell holding up the burning liquid in a ladle and pouring it slowly back into the container.

Spell

References 

Spanish distilled drinks
Distilled drinks
Galician mythology
Galician cuisine
Halloween food
Witchcraft in Spain